Beryl Adams Amedée is an American politician and businesswoman serving as a member of the Louisiana House of Representatives from the 51st district. Elected in November 2015, she assumed office on January 11, 2016.

Early life 
Amedée was born in Terrebonne Parish, Louisiana.

Career 
Amedée is the co-owner of Forerunner Errand and Concierge. She is also a pastor at the Vision Christian Center in Bourg, Louisiana and has served as a Terrebonne Parish elections commissioner since 2001. She was elected to the Louisiana House of Representatives in November 2015 and assumed office on January 11, 2016. Amedée authored legislation that would prohibit transgender athletes from competing on girls’ sports teams in schools. She also authored a proposal that would require medical providers to give patients a list of information about vaccines before administering them.

References 

Living people
People from Terrebonne Parish, Louisiana
Republican Party members of the Louisiana House of Representatives
Women state legislators in Louisiana
People from Houma, Louisiana
Year of birth missing (living people)